Mitchell Clement Dijks (born 9 February 1993) is a Dutch professional footballer who plays as a left back for Eredivisie club Vitesse.

Career

Ajax
Born in Purmerend, Dijks was recruited into the youth ranks of then AFC Ajax partner club FC Volendam in 2009. While playing for the Ajax A1 youth squad in 2011–12, Dijks helped his side to win the Nike Eredivisie league title, as well finishing as runners-up to Inter Milan in the NextGen Series (the Champions League equivalent for under-20 teams) after losing on penalties (5–3) following a 1–1 deadlock after extra time.

Dijks made his first team debut on 5 August 2012 against PSV in the Johan Cruyff Shield in which he played 76 minutes in before being subbed off for Dico Koppers and he also received a yellow card. Ajax lost the match 4–2. He then made his league debut with Ajax on 19 August 2012 against NEC, playing 79 minutes before being replaced by Joël Veltman. The match ended 6–1 in favor of Ajax. Dijks made a total of 6 league appearances playing in the left-back position. playing in a KNVB Cup match as well, all while helping Ajax to win the Eredivisie title in his debut season, making it the team's 32nd Dutch league title overall.

Heerenveen (loan)
For the 2013–14 Eredivisie season, Dijks signed on loan with fellow Dutch top-tier club SC Heerenveen. On 3 August 2013, in the season opener against AZ, he was sent off in his first match for his new club. He was ejected following a reckless tackle in the 71st minute of the match, which ended a 4–2 victory at the Abe Lenstra Stadion.

Willem II
On 28 August 2014, it was announced that Dijks had signed a two-year contract with Eredivisie side Willem II.

Return to Ajax
On 26 June 2015, Ajax announced they had re-signed Dijks from Willem II. As part of the deal Ajax youngsters Richairo Zivkovic, Ruben Ligeon and Lesly de Sa will head the other way on loan. On 30 January 2017, Dijks looked to join Norwich City FC on an initial loan deal.

Norwich City (loan)
In January 2017, having lost his position in the starting lineup to Daley Sinkgraven under newly appointed manager Peter Bosz, Dijks initially turned down a transfer option to play in the EFL Championship for Norwich City. He instead agreed upon a loan spell with the Canaries, which would last until the season ended. He scored his first professional goal on 7 February 2017 in a 2–2 away draw against Wigan Athletic with a powerful header in the 73rd minute.

Jong Ajax
Upon his return from Norwich City, Dijks originally trained with the first team, before it was decided that he would spend the rest of the season playing for Jong Ajax, the reserves team competing in the Dutch Eerste Divisie, the second tier of professional football in the Netherlands. Jong Ajax would go on to win the second division title that season with Dijks making 3 appearances in total.

Bologna
On 29 April 2018, it was announced that Dijks had signed a contract with Serie A team Bologna on a free transfer.
 He scored his first goal for the club on 12 August 2018 in a Coppa Italia match against Padova. He made his Serie A debut the following week in the home match against SPAL, and scored his first goal for the team on 8 April 2019, marking the final score in a 3–0 win over Chievo.

In the following season, after only five appearances, Dijks suffered an injury to the second toe of his right foot that would keep him sidelined for 5–6 months.

On 31 August 2022, his contract with Bologna was terminated by mutual consent.

International career

Youth
Dijks has represented the Netherlands at under-18, under-19, and the under-21 level. He was selected in the final Dutch under-19 squad for the elite stage of the 2012 Euro U19 qualification. He started and played in the team's first match of the elite stage against Norway U19 and lasted the full 90 while he gained a yellow card in the 54th minute as the Dutch won 2–1. He then played in the Netherlands last match of qualifiers against France U19 coming on a substitute in the 20th minute for Mats van Huijgevoort. The match ended in disaster for Dijks and the Dutch as they lost 6–0 and thus lost out European U19 qualification. On 15 August 2012, Dijks made his debut for the Dutch under-21 team in a friendly against Italy U21, coming on as a 46th-minute substitute for Johan Kappelhof as the Dutch lost 3–0.

Senior
Dijks received his first call up to the senior Netherlands team in March 2016 for friendlies against France and England.

Career statistics

Honours
Ajax A1 (under-19)
 A1 Eredivisie: 2011–12
 NextGen Series Runner-up: 2011–12

Ajax
 Eredivisie: 2012–13

References

External links
 Voetbal International profile 
Netherlands stats at OnsOranje

1993 births
Living people
People from Purmerend
Association football defenders
Dutch footballers
Netherlands under-21 international footballers
Netherlands youth international footballers
AFC Ajax players
Jong Ajax players
SC Heerenveen players
Willem II (football club) players
Norwich City F.C. players
Bologna F.C. 1909 players
Eredivisie players
Eerste Divisie players
English Football League players
Serie A players
Dutch expatriate footballers
Dutch expatriate sportspeople in England
Dutch expatriate sportspeople in Italy
Expatriate footballers in England
Expatriate footballers in Italy
Footballers from North Holland